Yang Kunpeng (born November 21, 1978 in Qingdao) is a Chinese football player.

Professional career
Yang Kunpeng began his professional football career playing for the Qingdao youth team before he eventually graduated to their senior team. While he initially broke into the senior team during the 1999 league season he struggled to gain a regular position within the following season team and failed to become a regular within first team. He would move to Bayi Football Team and under their Head coach Pei Encai he would revitalize his career and become a regular player within the team, however the 2003 league season saw the Bayi disbanded. He would follow his manager and join Wuhan Huanghelou and for the next four years was the starting center defender for the team. When Pei Encai left to take over the Chinese women's team tensions grew between the management and certain Shandong born players like Li Zhuangfei, Ren Yongshun, Guo Mingyue and Deng Xiaofei who believed that the management were mistreating them and purging them during the end of the 2007 league season. All these players would eventually leave the club and Yang was one of them when he decided to transfer back to his hometown in Qingdao in 2008.

Honours
Wuhan
China League One: 2004

References

External links
Player stats at football-lineups website
Player stats at sohu.com

1978 births
Living people
Chinese footballers
Footballers from Qingdao
Qingdao Hainiu F.C. (1990) players
Bayi Football Team players
Wuhan Guanggu players
Chinese Super League players
Association football defenders